Tenoch (or Tenuch) was a ruler of the Mexicas (Aztecas) during the fourteenth century during the Aztec travels from Aztlán to Tenochtitlan. Tenoch's father was Iztac Mixcoatl, who had a total of seven sons with two wives. The Tenochtitlan people were originally referred to as Tenochca, then the Mexica.

He was a respected chief who was elected to power by the council of elders and died sometime between 1350 and 1375, depending on the source. There is disagreement whether Tenoch is a mythological person or a real Mexica leader who was later mythologized. Tenoch was one of nine Mexica leaders who were told how Mexica could gain support from the forces of nature. After traveling southward for a span of 200 years, the Mexica found the sign. In honor of their leader, they named the small, reedy island in Lake Texcoco, Tenochtitlan. Tenochtitlan soon became the capital of the Aztec Empire.

The Nahuatl symbols of his name are found in the Mexican flag: Tetl, the rock, and Nochtli, the prickly pear cactus. The theocratic government of Tenoch lasted from 1269 to 1363. In 1325 he founded Mexico City, which was nicknamed Tenochtitlan, in honor of the claudillo

References 

Aztec nobility
1375 deaths
Year of birth unknown
Mythological city founders
Nobility of the Americas